The University of Dayton School of Law (UDSL) is a private law school located in Dayton, Ohio. It is affiliated with the University of Dayton, which is a Catholic university of the Society of Mary. The school is accredited by the American Bar Association and is a member of the Association of American Law Schools.

The school's 2022 class is made up of students from across the country, with 60% coming from places other than Ohio, with the then school’s acceptance rate being 28.32%, and the average student LSAT score being 154 and GPA being 3.58. For 2020, the first time bar examination pass rate was 83.21%.

History 
The School of Law was first established as the University of Dayton College of Law in 1922 under the guidance of Dean John C. Shea, the former first assistant director of law for Dayton. The college’s first class included two women and one African American. Economic issues during the Great Depression led the law school to close its doors in 1935.

The law school reopened in September 1974 under its current name. In July 1997, the school's current location, Joseph E. Keller Hall, was opened.

Curriculum

Online Hybrid Juris Doctor (JD) Program 
Through a hybrid J.D. program called Law@Dayton, students will be able to take most of their classes online, coming to campus for only a week each semester. The program received approval from the American Bar Association and started in 2019.

Program In Law And Technology (PILT) 
In 1989, the law school created the Program in Law and Technology (PILT), one of the first programs of its kind in the country. PILT offers courses in patent law, copyright and trademark law, business dimensions of intellectual property law, cyberspace law, entertainment law and the impact of technology on the practice of law. Collaborations with Emerson and LexisNexis provide hands-on experience in areas of data security and privacy, product liability, regulation and developing new legal products and services.

Human Rights Collaborative 
Through a partnership with the University of Dayton's Human Rights Center, law school students and faculty can work to protect the rights of vulnerable citizens across the world. The collaborative features a course on human rights and joint-research projects between the law school and the center.

Hanley Sustainability Collaborative 
Through a partnership with the University of Dayton's Hanley Sustainability Institute, students learn about issues surrounding the law and sustainability.

Concentrations 
The law school offers students the ability to take concentrations in six different areas: Business Law & Compliance, Civil Advocacy & Dispute Resolution, Criminal Law, Human & Civil Rights Law, Law & Technology and Personal & Family Law. The concentrations allow students to develop their skills and knowledge in those specific areas in an effort to give them better training in the field they plan to enter.

Non-J.D. Programs 
The law school offers both Master of Laws (LL.M.) and Master in the Study of Law (M.S.L.) degrees.

M.S.L. 
Through the M.S.L. program students are provided with an overview of the legal field and how it impacts various career fields.

Government Contracting M.S.L. 
In the Government Contracting and Procurement Program students learn the skills necessary to enter or advance in the contracting and procurement field.

Online LL.M. 
The Online LL.M. allows students to earn their second degree in law online without taking classes at the law school's campus.

On Campus LL.M. 
Through the On Campus LL.M. students attend the law school to earn their second degree in law.

Korea Program 
In the Korea Program, professors from the law school go to Korea to teach students about U.S. law.

Notable alumni
Hon. Frank Caruso '82 - 8th Judicial District, Niagara County, Supreme Court Justice
Hon. Beth Ann Buchanan '97 - U.S. Bankruptcy Judge, Southern District of Ohio
Michael B. Coleman '80 - First African-American Mayor of Columbus, Ohio.
Hon. Mary Donovan '77 - Ohio 2nd District Court of Appeals Judge
Hon. Frank Geraci '77 - Chief U.S. District Judge- Western District of New York
Martin Hamlette '02 - Executive Director, National Medical Association
David P. Joyce '82 - U.S. House of Representatives, Ohio 14th Congressional District
Hon. Elizabeth A. McClanahan '84 - Virginia Supreme Court Justice
Jeff Rezabek '97 - former Montgomery County Juvenile Court Judge; Served in Ohio House of Representatives, 43rd District
Timothy Young '92 - Ohio Public Defender
Douglas J. Swearingen, Jr., '12 - Ohio House of Representatives, 89th District
Karl George Kordalis '12 - Politician & Attorney

Notable attendees
 John Meehan, the antagonist of the true-crime podcast and eponymous TV series Dirty John

Post-Graduation Employment

According to Dayton Law's official 2022 ABA-required disclosures, 90% of the Class of 2021 obtained full-time, long-term, bar passage-required or J.D. preferred employment ten months after graduation, excluding solo-practitioners.

Ohio was the primary employment destination for 2021 Dayton Law graduates, with 60% of employed 2021 graduates working in the state.

Costs

Tuition at Dayton Law for traditional first-year residential students is $36,946 for the 2022-2023 academic year. Books and supplies are estimated at $1,500. Living and personal expenses are estimated at $17,000. The total cost of attendance at Dayton Law for the 2022-2023 academic year is $55,864. Total tuition for the 2022-2023 academic year for Online Hybrid students is $30,250.

U.S. News & World Report estimated the average indebtedness of 2016 Dayton Law graduates at $108,724.

Law School Transparency lists net tuition for Dayton Law at $12,893 for 2018-2019.

References

External links
University of Dayton School of Law

Catholic law schools in the United States
Law schools in Ohio
Law
Educational institutions established in 1922
1922 establishments in Ohio